The 2010 NORCECA Beach Volleyball Circuit is a North American beach volleyball tour. The tour consisted in ten tournaments in both genders.

Tournaments
The NORCECA scheduled the following tournaments:.
  Cayman Islands Tournament, Cayman Islands, March 19–21
  El Salvador Tournament, El Salvador, March 26–28
  Presidente Light Boca Chica Tournament, Boca Chica, Dominican Republic, April 2–4
   Guatemala Tournament, Guatemala, April 9–11
   Chiapas Tournament, Chiapas, Mexico, May 14–16
   Puerto Rico Tournament, Cabo Rojo Beach Volleyball Courts, Boquerón, Puerto Rico, June 30 – July 4
   Canada Tournament, Toronto, Canada, August 11–15
   Saint Lucia Tournament, Saint Lucia, August 18–22
   San Diego Tournament, San Diego, United States, September 15–20
   Tijuana Tournament, Tijuana, Mexico, September 22–26
   Maeva Manzanillo Tournament, Manzanillo, Mexico, September 29 – October 3
   Puerto Vallarta Tournament, Puerto Vallarta, Mexico, October 6–11
   Cuba Tournament, Varadero, Cuba, October 20–24
   Nicaragua Tournament, Nicaragua, October 27–31
   Trinidad & Tobago Tournament, Trinidad and Tobago, November 17–21

References

External links
 Norceca News

North American
2010